La Habra Marketplace, formerly La Habra Fashion Square, is an open-air regional mall in La Habra, California, built by the Bullock's department store chain. Welton Becket and Associates were the architects. It was the last and largest of the "Fashion Square" malls that it built, after Santa Ana, Sherman Oaks and Del Amo. The center has been re-developed into a strip mall called La Habra Marketplace.

Original tenants
Department stores (major and junior) at launch were:
Bullock's - as of 1987 measuring 
Buffum's - as of 1987 measuring 
Joseph Magnin - )
Silverwoods

Other stores at opening included Hickory Farms, B. Dalton Bookseller, Damon's, Draper's, Leed's, See's Candy,  Slavick's Jewelers, United California Bank and Crocker-Citizens Bank. Restaurants included Fiddler's Three, Don Paul and Lyons.

Reception
Partially due to the proximity of other malls, and also that the envisioned Imperial Highway (SR-90) and Beach Boulevard (SR-39) freeways were not built in time and thus never brought the expected traffic, the mall turned out to be disappointing and generally had disappointing sales performance.

By 1987, at $27.8 million, annual sales were second to last of Orange County's 14 regional malls, and its sales per square foot were last of 48 regional malls in Southern California regional malls, at $50.78 versus, for example, $190.09 at South Coast Plaza.

The Bullock's store was closed in 1992, razed in the late 1990s and strip mall buildings were constructed in the mall's place.

Current shopping center
The community shopping center now on the site is named La Habra Marketplace and has  of gross leasable area. Current tenants include Smart & Final (formerly Drug Emporium), Ross Dress for Less, LA Fitness, Sprouts Farmers Market (formerly OfficeMax) and Regal Cinemas.

References

1969 establishments in California
Bullock's
La Habra, California
Shopping malls established in 1969
Shopping malls in Orange County, California
Community shopping centers
Welton Becket buildings